Elihu Abrahams (April 3, 1927 – October 18, 2018) was a theoretical physicist, specializing in condensed matter physics.

Abrahams attended Brooklyn Technical High School, graduating in 1944. In 1947 Abrahams received his bachelor's degree and in 1952 his PhD, with Charles Kittel as thesis advisor, from the University of California, Berkeley with thesis Spin-lattice relaxation in ferromagnetics. In 1952–1953 he was a research associate in physics at UC Berkeley. He was in 1953–1955 a research associate and in 1955–1956 an assistant professor at the University of Illinois, Urbana-Champaign. In 1956 he became an assistant professor, then an associate professor, and in 1964 a full professor at Rutgers University.

From 1979 to 1983, he was the president of the Aspen Center for Physics.

In 1979 Abrahams, Philip W. Anderson, Donald Licciardello and T.V. Ramakrishnan published the highly influential paper "Scaling Theory of Localization: Absence of Quantum Diffusion in Two Dimensions" in Physical Review Letters 42. Often referred to as the "gang of four paper" in physics circles, the authors proposed new, precise predictions about the behavior of electrons in disordered materials. In 2003 the American Physical Society named it among the top-ten most often cited papers published in the Physical Review.

In 1964 Abrahams was elected a Fellow of the American Physical Society. He was a Guggenheim Fellow for the academic year 1986–1987. He was also elected to the National Academy of Sciences in 1987, and to the American Academy of Arts and Sciences in 1999. In 2018, he received the 2019 Oliver E. Buckley Condensed Matter Physics Prize for "pioneering research in the physics of disordered materials and hopping conductivity" together with Alexei L. Efros and Boris I. Shklovskii.

Selected publications
with C. Kittel: Dipolar broadening of magnetic resonance lines in magnetically diluted crystals. Physical Review, 1953 
with A. Miller: Impurity conduction at low concentrations. Physical Review, 1960 
with T. Tsuneto: Time variation of the Ginzburg-Landau order parameter. Physical Review, 1966 
with P.W. Anderson, D.C. Licciardello, T.V. Ramakrishnan: Scaling theory of localization: Absence of quantum diffusion in two dimensions. Physical Review Letters, 1979 
with P.W. Anderson, P.A. Lee, T.V. Ramakrishnan: Quasiparticle lifetime in disordered two-dimensional metals. Physical Review B, 1981 
with R.G. Palmer, D.L. Stein, P.W. Anderson: Models of hierarchically constrained dynamics for glassy relaxation. Physical Review Letters, 1984 
with C.M. Varma, S. Schmitt-Rink: Charge transfer excitations and superconductivity in “ionic” metals. Solid state communications, 1987 
with S.V. Kravchenko, M.P. Sarachik: Metallic behavior and related phenomena in two dimensions. Reviews of Modern Physics, 2001 
with S.Y. Savrasov, G. Kotliar: Correlated electrons in δ-plutonium within a dynamical mean-field picture. Nature, 2001 
with Q. Si: Strong correlations and magnetic frustration in the high Tc iron pnictides. Physical Review Letters, 2008

References

1927 births
2018 deaths
People from Port Henry, New York
American physicists
University of California, Berkeley alumni
University of Illinois faculty
Rutgers University faculty
Fellows of the American Physical Society
Members of the United States National Academy of Sciences
Scientists from New York (state)
Oliver E. Buckley Condensed Matter Prize winners